Bellardia trixago is a species of flowering plant in the family Orobanchaceae (it has been formerly classified in the family Scrophulariaceae). The only member of the monotypic genus Bellardia, it is known as trixago bartsia or Mediterranean lineseed. This plant is native to the Mediterranean Basin, but it is known in other places with similar climates, such as California and parts of Chile, where it is an introduced species and noxious weed.

Etymology 
The genus name Bellardia is a taxonomic patronym in honor of Carlo Antonio Lodovico Bellardi (1741-1826), an Italian botanist from Piedmont.

The species name trixago has two possible etymologies.
 It derives from the ancient Greek word , meaning "hair", and the Latin suffix ago used to indicate a property, and refers to the glandular-hairy characteristic of the plant.
It is also the old Latin name of germanders (genus Teucrium).

Description 
This is an erect plant often reaching over half a meter in height. Its foliage is rich green and dotted with glands and hairs. The sawtoothed leaves extend about halfway up the plant, with the upper half of the stem being occupied with a stout inflorescence which narrows to a point. The inflorescence has rows of leaflike bracts, between which emerge showy purple and white lipped, hooded flowers, each over two centimeters wide. The fruit is a smooth, green capsule. Mediterranean lineseed, like other broomrapes, is parasitic; this species is hemiparasitic in that it is green and photosynthetic but also taps into the roots of other plants to extract nutrients.

Phylogeny 
The phylogeny of the genera of Rhinantheae has been explored using molecular characters. Bellardia belongs to the core Rhinantheae. Bellardia is closely related to Parentucellia, to some Bartsia taxa, and to Odontites. In turn, these genera share phylogenetic affinities with Tozzia and Hedbergia, and then with Euphrasia and Bartsia.

References

External links 
 
 Jepson Manual Treatment
 California Invasive Plant Council
 Photo gallery

Orobanchaceae
Parasitic plants